Warren Mehrtens (November 5, 1920 – December 30, 1997) was an American Thoroughbred horse racing jockey best known for winning the U.S. Triple Crown in 1946.

Born in Brooklyn, New York, Warren Mehrtens graduated from Jamaica High School in 1938. Growing up near Aqueduct Racetrack he was a fan of Thoroughbred racing and after finishing school pursued a career as a professional jockey. Under the guidance of future U.S. Racing Hall of Fame trainer Max Hirsch, he won his first race in 1940 and soon began winning important races at Chicago and New York City area racetracks.

In 1946, twenty-six-year-old Warren Mehrtens rode Assault to victory in the Wood Memorial Stakes, then swept all three of the American Classic Races to become only the seventh jockey in history to win the U.S. Triple Crown Champion.

Mehrtens retired from racing in 1952 and went to work as a race steward at Keeneland Race Course in Lexington, Kentucky and later at Delaware Park Racetrack in Stanton, Delaware before joining the New York Racing Association in 1973.

Warren Mehrtens died in Sarasota, Florida in 1997 at age seventy-seven.

References
 January 1, 1998 obituary for Warren Mehrtens at the New York Times
 May. 13, 1946 TIME magazine article on Warren Mehrtens' win in the Kentucky Derby

1920 births
1997 deaths
American jockeys
Sportspeople from Brooklyn